Triacanthus biaculeatus, also known as the Short-nosed tripod fish, or Silver horse-fish is a species of marine fish in the family Triacanthidae. It is native to the Indian Ocean and the western Pacific Ocean. Its caudal fin is yellow. As the fish looks like a helicopter, it is locally known as the Helicopter fish in West Bengal.It has a long history providing food for the native culture.

References

Further reading
Arshad, A., Jimmy A., Amin N. S. M., Sidik J. B., & Harah Z. M. (2008).  Length–weight and length–length relationships of five fish species collected from seagrass beds of the Sungai Pulai estuary, Peninsular Malaysia. Journal of Applied Ichthyology. 24(3), 328–329.
Santini, F., & Tyler J. C. (2002).  Phylogeny and biogeography of the extant species of triplespine fishes (Triacanthidae, Tetraodontiformes). Zoologica Scripta. 31(4), 321–330.

Tetraodontiformes
Taxa named by Marcus Elieser Bloch
Fish described in 1786